The Matapédia Bridge crosses the Restigouche River from Matapédia, Quebec to Flatlands, New Brunswick, connecting New Brunswick Route 11 to Quebec Route 132.

References 

Road bridges in Quebec
Road bridges in New Brunswick
Transport in Restigouche County, New Brunswick
Buildings and structures in Restigouche County, New Brunswick
Transport in Gaspésie–Îles-de-la-Madeleine
Buildings and structures in Gaspésie–Îles-de-la-Madeleine